Cresap may refer to:

People
Michael Cresap
Thomas Cresap

Places
Cresap, West Virginia, an unincorporated community in Marshall County

See also
Cresap's War, 1730–1767